This page provides supplementary chemical data on Chlorobenzene.

Material Safety Data Sheet  

The handling of this chemical may incur notable safety precautions. It is highly recommend that you seek the Material Safety Datasheet (MSDS) for this chemical from a reliable source and follow its directions.  An external MSDS is available here.

Structure and properties

Thermodynamic properties

Vapor pressure of liquid

Viscosity of liquid

Thermal Conductivity of liquid

Spectral data

References 

Chemical data pages
Chemical data pages cleanup